was a private university in Shinshiro, Aichi, Japan. The predecessor of the school, a junior college, was founded in 1999. It became a four-year college in 2004. It ceased admitting new students in 2010, and it closed in 2013 following financial difficulties.

Access
The school was accessible by bus or train, via Mikawa-Tōgō Station on the Iida Line.

References

External links
 Official website 

Educational institutions established in 1999
1999 establishments in Japan
Educational institutions disestablished in 2013
2013 disestablishments in Japan
Universities and colleges in Aichi Prefecture
Defunct private universities and colleges in Japan